Summer '03 is a 2018 American comedy-drama film written and directed by Becca Gleason. The film stars Joey King, Jack Kilmer, Andrea Savage, Erin Darke, Kelly Lamor Wilson, Stephen Ruffin, Paul Scheer and June Squibb. It was released on September 28, 2018 by Blue Fox Entertainment.

Cast  
 Joey King as Jamie Winkle, a young girl who is dealing with her grandmother's death
 Jack Kilmer as Luke
 Andrea Savage as Shira Winkle, Jamie's overbearing mother who tries to keep Jamie in line
 Erin Darke as Hope
 Kelly Lamor Wilson as Emily
 Stephen Ruffin as March
 Paul Scheer as Ned Winkle
 June Squibb as Dotty Winkle
 Steffan Argus as Josh
 Monica Mathis as Jamie's Friend
 Logan Medina as Dylan
 Travis James as Buck
 John Weselcouch as Doctor Spaulding
 Elise DuQuette as Officer Quincy
 Bill Eudaly as Father Patrick
 Paul Ryden as Randall Smithton
 Jared Gray as Nico
 Nick Caruso as Ranger Todd Brown
 Rick Andosca as Herman
 Melissa Youngblood as Laura Tomlinson
 Morgan Savoy as Stephanie Willis
 Hayden Burrell as Young Ned's friend

Production
Principal photography began on September 19, 2017 in Atlanta, Georgia.

Release
The film premiered at South by Southwest on March 10, 2018. The film was released on September 28, 2018 by Blue Fox Entertainment.

Reception
Summer '03 received mixed reviews from critics. On Rotten Tomatoes, the film holds a 61% "fresh" rating based on reviews from 23 critics. On Metacritic, the film has a weighted average score of 45% based on reviews from five critics.

References

External links
 

2018 films
2018 comedy-drama films
American comedy-drama films
Films set in 2003
2010s English-language films
2010s American films
2010s coming-of-age films
American coming-of-age films
American coming-of-age comedy-drama films